North London Grammar School is a non-denominational private secondary and preparatory school for girls and boys aged 718 located in Hendon, Barnet, a suburb of North London, England.

NLGS was formerly the Wisdom School, established in Tottenham, Haringey in 2006. The expanded school, which opened in September 2014, offers a 50,000 square foot site versus the former 6000 square foot Tottenham site.

The school was rated Outstanding in all categories according to Ofsted's 2018 report.

The school has a capacity for 330 students and space for 30 boarding students. The boarding site is located within the school building. The school accepts day/boarding, local, national and international students.

The recently refurbished boarding house is home to 29 boys. They are of mixed year groups, with their number of boarders ranging from year 8 to year 11. Our boarders develop a close attachment to their peers, where they live and study under the care of a supervisor who knows them thoroughly and who maintains a close relationship with their families back home. Our boarding is accredited by the Boarding Schools Association.

References

External links
 North London Grammar School

2006 establishments in England
Educational institutions established in 2006
Boarding schools in London
Private co-educational schools in London
Private schools in the London Borough of Barnet